Francesco Busti (1678–1767) was an Italian painter of the late-Baroque and Neoclassical periods.

Biography
He was born in Perugia. He was putatively a pupil of Giovanni Battista Gaulli. One of his pupils was Nicola Giuli and Baldassare Orsini, who later became an art historian. He painted an altarpiece of St Vincent Ferrer of the church of San Domenico in Perugia.

References

1678 births
1767 deaths
17th-century Italian painters
Italian male painters
18th-century Italian painters
Italian Baroque painters
Umbrian painters
18th-century Italian male artists